Left for Live is a live album by John Entwistle, who was the bassist for The Who.

In 1995, Entwistle put together a backing band with producer Steve Luongo that he christened as simply 'The John Entwistle Band'. The outfit also featured guitarist Godfrey Townsend and keyboardist Gordon Cotten with harmony vocals performed by all the members. The group documented their 1998 tour, during which they performed a mix of new, solo and classic songs from The Who.

The song "Under a Raging Moon" is written by John Parr (from St Elmo's Fire fame) and Julia Downes and is included on Roger Daltrey's 1985 solo album of the same name, the track is a tribute to The Who's drummer Keith Moon who died in 1978. It was said that Entwistle wanted to play this song instead of Won't Get Fooled Again at Live Aid with The Who but Pete Townshend disagreed so Entwistle wanted to record his own version instead as a tribute to Moon.

When Allmusic rated the album they said, "John Entwistle may be the most esteemed bass guitarist in rock & roll – and he's a proven songwriter, too. But while Entwistle's thundering basslines and seminal synthesizer work helped make the Who the godfathers of arena rock, Left for Live is a sorry imitation. Most of the album is just generic bluster.

Track listing
All songs written by John Entwistle except those noted

Personnel
John Entwistle – lead vocals, backing vocals, 8-string bass guitar, bass guitar
Godfrey Townsend – guitar, backing vocals
Steve Luongo – drums, backing vocals
Gordon Cotten – keyboards, backing vocals

References

John Entwistle live albums
1999 albums
1999 live albums
Albums produced by Jon Astley